Ventspils Municipality is a municipality in Courland, Latvia. The municipality was formed in 2009 by merging Piltene town, Ance Parish, Jūrkalne Parish, Piltene rural community (from 2010 Piltene Parish), Pope Parish, Puze Parish, Tārgale Parish, Ugāle Parish, Usma Parish, Užava Parish, Vārve Parish, Ziras Parish and Zlēkas Parish. It is administered from Ventspils city, which is not included within its limits. The population in 2020 was 10,824.

See also 
 Administrative divisions of Latvia (2009)

References 

 
Municipalities of Latvia